Yaw Osei (born 19 February 1998) is a Swaziland-born Ghanaian footballer who plays as a forward.

Career

Osei played for a local team, Langley Zebras where he was seen by Reading F.C. Over the years he was in and out of the academy without earning a contract before joining JMA Reading FC based at John Madejski Academy for 2 years. Osei also signed for a Non league youth side Windsor F.C making 11 appearances as a substitute and scoring 12 goals in the season (2013/2014). Osei spent his youth career with Windsor F.C and Chalfont St Peter. Osei shone as he was the youngest 1st team player at Chalfont  and with his great physical attributes he stood out mostly playing on the wing. On 14 July 2016, after having scored and impressed Raith Rovers manager Gary Locke in a pre-season friendly against Arbroath, Osei signed a professional contract with Raith Rovers. A day later, he made his professional debut as a substitute in a Scottish League Cup win over Cove Rangers, a match where he also saw his first yellow card for the club. Osei made his league debut on 11 March 2017 in a 4–0 defeat to Dumbarton. Osei was released by Raith following the end of the 2017–18 season.

Career statistics

References

External links
 
 

1998 births
Living people
Ghanaian footballers
Association football forwards
Raith Rovers F.C. players
Chalfont St Peter A.F.C. players
Scottish Professional Football League players